William Lawson (born 27 February 1987) is a Scottish former speedway rider.

Career
Lawson's first British league team was Newcastle Diamonds, where he spent the 2003 and 2004 seasons. In 2005, Lawson signed for Edinburgh Monarchs for the 2005 Premier League speedway season. He would stay with the club for four years, while also riding for Wolverhampton Wolves in 2006 and 2007. After spells with Glasgow and Berwick in 2009 he rode with the Belle Vue Aces in the British Elite League during 2010. He announced his retirement before the 2011 season.

In 2018, he made a surprise comeback for one of his former clubs the Edinburgh Monarchs. He spent for more seasons with them from 2018 until 2022.

Results

World Championships 
 Individual Under-21 World Championship
 2007 - 12th placed in the Semi-Final One
 2008 -  Pardubice - 14th placed (4 pts)
 Team Under-21 World Championship (Under-21 Speedway World Cup)
 2008 - 3rd placed in the Qualifying Round One

See also 
 Great Britain national under-21 speedway team

References 

1987 births
Living people
British speedway riders
Scottish speedway riders
Belle Vue Aces riders
Berwick Bandits riders
Edinburgh Monarchs riders
Glasgow Tigers riders
Newcastle Diamonds riders
Wolverhampton Wolves riders